The Seoul Olympic Organizing Committee for the Games of the XXIV Olympiad, or SLOOC, also known as the Seoul Olympic Organizing Committee, was an informal name for the Seoul Olympic Organizing Committee for the Games of the XXIV Olympiad. The President of SLOOC was Park Seh-jik.

Leadership

Board members
The board members are:
 Park Seh-jik - President
 Kim Un-yong - Vice President

References

1988 Summer Olympics
Organising Committees for the Olympic Games
Summer Olympics
Sport in Seoul
Sports competitions in South Korea
1981 establishments in South Korea